Le Vampire (English: The Vampire) is an inverted roller coaster at La Ronde amusement park in Montreal, Quebec, Canada, designed by the Swiss firm Bolliger & Mabillard (B&M). It is a mirror image of Batman: The Ride, but the roller coaster has no association to the Batman media franchise and was given an unrelated name and a slightly different cosmetic appearance. The track is 823 metres in length and reaches a height of nearly 32 metres. Riders sit with their legs dangling such as on a ski chairlift and reach speeds of up to 80.5 km/hour and loop head-over-heels five times. The Vampire can carry up to 1,400 riders per hour.

The ride was closed due to an accident on July 6, 2012. It opened for the first time since the incident on August 13, 2012. On September 3, 2015, the park announced that the ride would run backwards for a limited time during the 2016 season and become part of a new section of the park.

Le Vampire was constructed by Martin & Vleminckx.

See also
Incidents at La Ronde
Batman: The Ride

References

External links

Vampire at La Ronde website

La Ronde (amusement park)
Roller coasters in Quebec
Roller coasters introduced in 2002
2002 establishments in Quebec
Inverted roller coasters manufactured by Bolliger & Mabillard